Moses Margoliouth (1820–1881) was a Polish-born British scholar and Jewish convert to Christianity. He became a minister in the Church of England. Alongside Elieser Bassin, he was also one of the first proponents of British Israelism to be of Jewish descent. He published History of the Jews in Great Britain (1851) and Vestiges of the Historic Anglo-Hebrews in East Anglia (1870).

His nephew was David Samuel Margoliouth.

Life
He was born of Jewish parents at Suwałki, Poland, on 3 December 1820. He was instructed at Pryerosl, Grodno, and Kalwarya in talmudic and rabbinical learning, and also acquired Russian and German. In August 1837, during a visit to Liverpool, he was induced to carefully study the Hebrew New Testament, with the result that on 13 April 1838 he was baptised a member of the Church of England. For a time he obtained a livelihood by giving lessons in Hebrew, but in January 1840 he entered Trinity College, Dublin, to prepare for ordination, and during the vacations studied at the Hebrew College, London.

In 1843, he became instructor of Hebrew, German, and English at the Liverpool Institution for Inquiring Jews. On 30 June 1844, he was ordained to the curacy of St. Augustine, Liverpool. Three months later, the Bishop of Kildare obtained for him the incumbency of Glasnevin, near Dublin, and made him his examining chaplain. The parish being small, Margoliouth had much leisure for literary pursuits. He started a Hebrew Christian monthly magazine, entitled The Star of Jacob, which extended to six numbers (January–June 1847), and tried to establish a Philo-Hebraic Society for promoting the study of Hebrew literature, and for reprinting scarce Hebrew works. He subsequently served curacies at Tranmere, Cheshire; St. Bartholomew, Salford; Wybunbury, Cheshire (1853-5); St. Paul, Haggerston, London; Wyton, Huntingdonshire; and St. Paul, Onslow Square, London. In 1857, he accepted the Ph.D. degree of Erlangen.

Among the Jewish nation he was an indefatigable worker. In 1847, he visited the Holy Land, and on his return published an interesting account of his wanderings. During his travels he made the acquaintance of many celebrated men, among whom were August Neander, Felix Mendelssohn Bartholdy, and Giuseppe Caspar Mezzofanti. In 1877, he was presented to the vicarage of Little Linford, Buckinghamshire.

He died in London on 25 February 1881, and was buried in Little Linford churchyard.

Publications
 The Oracles of God, and Their Vindication: Being a Sermon [on Ezek. Xiii. 7], Etc (1870)
 The History of the Jews in Great Britain
 The Poetry of the Hebrew Pentateuch: Being Four Essays on Moses and the Mosaic Age (1871)

References
 Oxford Dictionary of National Biography

Notes

External link

Attribution

1820 births
1881 deaths
People from Suwałki
Jewish historians
Converts to Anglicanism from Judaism
British people of Polish-Jewish descent